Halgerda paliensis is a species of sea slug, a dorid nudibranch, shell-less marine gastropod mollusks in the family Discodorididae.

Taxonomic history 
Originally described as Sclerodoris paliensis, this species was transferred to the genus Halgerda in 2001.

Distribution 
This species was described from Hawaii, where it is apparently endemic.

References 

Discodorididae
Gastropods described in 1982
Endemic fauna of Hawaii